Laure Koster (23 April 1902 – 22 October 1999) was a Luxembourgian swimmer. She competed in the women's 200 metre breaststroke event at the 1924 Summer Olympics. She was the first woman to represent Luxembourg at the Olympics.

References

External links
 

1902 births
1999 deaths
Luxembourgian female swimmers
Olympic swimmers of Luxembourg
Swimmers at the 1924 Summer Olympics
Sportspeople from Luxembourg City
20th-century Luxembourgian people